Priebe is a surname. Although mainly found in German-speaking countries, it is derived from the Slavic name Pribislav.

Notable people with the surname include:

 Berl Priebe (1918–2014), American farmer and politician
 Jeanette Brooks Priebe (born 1937), director of the Louisville Civil Service Board
 Karl Priebe (1914–1976), American painter
 Kenneth E. Priebe (1912–1986), American politician
 Stefan Priebe, German-British psychologist

References

See also
 

Surnames of Slavic origin